is a three-man Japanese conte group consisting of two boke, and  - usually referred to as , and one tsukkomi, . Their trio name comes from the Kinnikuman character, Neptuneman.

The group debuted with Ohta Production back in 1994 but is currently with the talent agency Watanabe Entertainment.

Members
 Jun Nagura (名倉潤) Born November 4, 1968 in Himeji, Hyōgo. Plays the tsukkomi.
 Taizō Harada (原田泰造) Born March 24, 1970 in Higashimurayama, Tokyo. Plays the boke.
 Ken Horiuchi (堀内健) Born November 28, 1969 in Yokosuka, Kanagawa. Plays the boke.

References

External links
Profile at Watanabe Entertainment

Japanese comedy troupes
Watanabe Entertainment